Stanhopea nigripes is a species of orchid endemic to Peru.

References

External links 

nigripes
Endemic orchids of Peru